Charcot disease can refer to several diseases named for Jean-Martin Charcot, such as:

 Amyotrophic lateral sclerosis, a degenerative muscle disease also known as Charcot disease or Lou Gehrig's disease
 Charcot–Marie–Tooth disease, an inherited demyelinating disease of the peripheral nervous system
 Neuropathic arthropathy, progressive degeneration of a weight bearing joint, also known as Charcot joint disease or Charcot arthropathy
 Spinal osteoarthropathy, a rare abnormal bone growth disorder in reptiles

See also
 Jean-Martin Charcot#Eponyms